Abdullah Al-Fayhani (Arabic:عبد الله الفيحاني) (born 6 December 1991) is a Qatari footballer. He currently plays for Al-Shahania . His position is midfielder.

External links

References

Qatari footballers
1991 births
Living people
Association football wingers
Al-Sailiya SC players
Al-Shahania SC players
Qatari Second Division players
Qatar Stars League players